Vizhi Moodi Yosithaal is a 2014 Tamil-language science fiction-romantic thriller film based around the concept of extrasensory perception. It is written and directed by debutante K. G. Senthil Kumar, starring himself and Nikita. Vizhi Moodi Yosithaal is one of the first few Tamil films to use Auro 11.1 sound technology.

Plot
The hero of the film, KG (K. G. Senthil Kumar), has a gift of seeing five minutes into his future, but he would not be able to see his future if he is either intoxicated with alcohol or sleeping. KG does not realize that he has a gift until Niki (Nikita), the girl he loved with heart and soul, is killed by a group of four terrorists right in front of his eyes while he had consumed alcohol. Once he realizes that if he would not have had alcohol and that he could have saved Niki's life, KG sets on a mission to find the culprits who killed Niki. While he finds the whereabouts of each terrorist and kills them one by one, he unravels the master plan of a big terrorist network to attack all the power stations of the entire state of Tamil Nadu, thereby causing panic and economic depression in the state. KG also finds out that the terrorists plan to do the same in all the states in India after hitting Tamil Nadu, in order to collapse the entire Indian economy. Using his power to see five minutes into the future and with the help of his friends, KG successfully kills the mastermind behind this attack and saves the state of Tamil Nadu from a great disaster. Realizing that he has got a gift that not any normal person would have, he dedicates himself to the society and roams around his city as a watchdog to save people from any possible terrorist attacks in the future.

Cast
 K. G. Senthil Kumar as KG
 Nikita as Niki
 Urvashi as KG's mother
 Bala Singh as Bai
 Amit Bhargav 
 Bhanu Sri Mehra as Megha
 Misha Ghoshal as Hasini
 Mahesh Subramaniam
 Srinivasan as a College Alumna (guest appearance)

Production
The title of the film was inspired by a song from the movie Ayan.

Soundtrack

The film's soundtrack was composed by B.Aathif. The album features six tracks and was released on 2 November 2014.

Release
The film was released on 21 November 2014 over 110 Screens across Tamil Nadu.

Critical reception
The film has got mixed reviews from audience and critics.

References

Indian science fiction thriller films
2010s science fiction thriller films
2010s Tamil-language films
2014 masala films